E3 ubiquitin-protein ligase RNF19A is an enzyme that in humans is encoded by the RNF19A gene.

The protein encoded by this gene contains two RING-finger motifs and an IBR (in between RING fingers) motif. This protein is an E3 ubiquitin ligase that is localized in Lewy bodies (LBs), neuronal inclusions characteristic of Parkinson's disease (PD). This protein interacts with UBE2L3/UBCH7 and UBE2E2/UBCH8, but not other ubiquitin-conjugating enzymes. This protein is found to bind and ubiquitylate synphilin 1 (SNCAIP), which is an interacting protein of alpha-synuclein in neurons, and a major component of LB. Alternatively-spliced transcript variants encoding the same protein have been reported.

See also
 RING finger domain

References

Further reading

External links 
 

RING finger proteins